Gérald Passi (born 21 January 1964) is a French former professional footballer who played as a midfielder.

Personal life
Passi was born in Albi, Tarn. He comes from a family of footballers. His father, Camille, was a Congolese former footballer, and coach in his later career. His brother, Franck, was also a professional footballer. His nephew, Bryan, is a professional footballer who has also played for Montpellier.

Career statistics

Club

International

Honours
Monaco
 Coupe de France: 1991
 UEFA Cup Winners' Cup runner-up: 1992

References

External links
 
 
 
 
 Profile 
 Profile

1964 births
Living people
Sportspeople from Albi
French footballers
France international footballers
French sportspeople of Republic of the Congo descent
French expatriate footballers
French expatriate sportspeople in Japan
Montpellier HSC players
Toulouse FC players
AS Monaco FC players
AS Saint-Étienne players
Nagoya Grampus players
Ligue 1 players
Ligue 2 players
J1 League players
Expatriate footballers in Japan
Association football midfielders
Footballers from Occitania (administrative region)